Paul Robertson is an Australian animator known for his pixel art and animation. Born Paul Laurence Adelbert Garfield Robertson on 9 August 1979 in Geelong, Victoria, he was named after comedian Paul Lynde and the popular comic and cartoon character, Garfield the cat.

Notable works

Videogame art
The Invincible Iron Man (2002)
Backyard Football (2002) (GBA version)
Pitfall: The Lost Expedition (2003) (GBA version)
Ice Nine (2003) (Map Artist)
Action Man: Robot Atak (2004)
Teenage Mutant Ninja Turtles: Battle for the City (2005) (Plug and Play game)
Sigma Star Saga (2005)
Barbie and the Magic of Pegasus (2005) (GBA version)
Looney Tunes Double Pack (2005)
Batman: Multiply, Divide and Conquer (2005) (Leapster)
Number Raiders (2005) (Leapster)
Word Chasers (2005) (Leapster)
Letterpillar (2005) (Leapster)
Justice League Heroes: The Flash (2006)
X-Men: The Official Game (2006) (GBA version)
American Dragon Jake Long: Rise of the Huntsclan! (2006)
SpongeBob SquarePants: Creature from the Krusty Krab (2006) (Nintendo DS version)
Barbie in the 12 Dancing Princesses (2006) (GBA and Nintendo DS versions)
Unfabulous (2006)
Contra 4 (2007)
Drawn to Life (2007)
Lock's Quest (2008)
Hikkikomori Quest (2008)
SpongeBob SquarePants: Fists of Foam (2008) (Leapster Diji)
Nicktoons: Android Invasion (2008) (Leapster Diji)
Drawn to Life: The Next Chapter (2009)
Where the Wild Things Are (2009) (Nintendo DS version)
Scott Pilgrim vs. the World: The Game (2010)
Shantae: Risky's Revenge (2010)
Aliens: Infestation (2011)
Wizorb (2011)
iCarly: Groovy Foodie! (2012)
Scribblenauts Unlimited (2012)
Adventure Time: Hey Ice King! Why’d You Steal Our Garbage?! (2012)
Fez (2012)
Shantae and the Pirate's Curse (2014)
Mercenary Kings (2014)
Curses 'N Chaos (2015)
Teenage Mutant Ninja Turtles: Shredder's Revenge (2022)

Short films
Pirate Baby's Cabana Battle Street Fight 2006 (2006)
Kings of Power 4 Billion% (2008)
Super Dino Boys - Adult Swim (2015)
Rick and Morty in the Eternal Nightmare Machine - Adult Swim (2021)

Theatrical films
Scott Pilgrim vs. the World (2010)

Television
Gravity Falls - Fight Fighters (2012), Soos and the Real Girl (2014), and Weirdmageddon 1 & Weirdmageddon 3: Take Back The Falls (2016)
Rick and Morty - Season 3 promo (2017), Rick and Morty in the Eternal Nightmare Machine (2021)
The Simpsons - Season 26 Episode 14, "My Fare Lady", Couch Gag
Adventure Time - Main Title, "Diamonds and Lemons"
Amphibia - 8-bit Theme Song Takeover (2020)

Music videos
 Architecture in Helsinki - "Do the Whirlwind" (2005)
 Delta Heavy - "White Flag" (2016)

References

External links
Paul Robertson on Tumblr
Paul Robertson on LiveJournal

Paul Robertson on Patreon

1979 births
Flash artists
Australian animators
Australian animated film directors
Living people